Events in the year 1476 in Norway.

Incumbents
Monarch: Christian I

Events

Arts and literature

Births

Deaths
Hartvig Krummedige, nobleman (born c. 1400).

References

Norway